Semenov-Tian-Shansky Peak is a mountain in the Kyrgyz Ala-Too Range of the Tian Shan. It is located in Ala Archa National Park in Kyrgyzstan. It is the tallest mountain in the Kyrgyz Ala-Too Range and is an Ultra with a prominence of 2231m.

The mountain is situated between the Ala-Archa River to the west and the Alamedin River to the east.

History 
The peak is named for the Russian geographer Peter Semenov-Tian-Shansky.

References

Mountains of Kyrgyzstan
Chüy Region
Four-thousanders of the Tian Shan
Mountains of Ala Archa National Park